The Copa Fraternidad 1975 was the fifth Central American club championship played between 6 clubs.

Teams

Results

Standings

Champion

External links
RSSSF - Copa Fraternidad

1975
1
1974–75 in Costa Rican football
1974–75 in Salvadoran football
1974–75 in Guatemalan football